Real Emotional Girl is the third solo album recorded by the Canadian singer Patricia O'Callaghan. Co-released by the Marquis and Teldec/Atlantic labels in March 2001, it features the classically trained soprano’s interpretations of several well-known popular songs, including Bob Dylan’s "Like a Rolling Stone" and Randy Newman’s "Real Emotional Girl". But rather than standard cover versions these are original, highly personalised "cabaret"-style performances – most notably so of the Dylan and Newman songs – that suggest how these songs might have sounded had they been recorded before the advent of pop music itself (such as, say, in 1920s’ Paris or Berlin). Among the other tracks are O’Callaghan's highly acclaimed version of Leonard Cohen’s "Hallelujah" and four other of his songs, including "I'm Your Man".

Real Emotional Girl was O'Callaghan's first album to be distributed in the United States and to be co-released by a major label. It received the rare accolade of a rating of four-and-a-half stars from the AllMusic website. The AllMusic reviewer J. T. Griffith wrote that O'Callaghan's interpretations "are often inspired". Christopher Loudon wrote in JazzTimes magazine that "O'Callaghan sings with a gut-level truthfulness that ranks her among the most genuine artists on the contemporary cabaret scene".

Track listing 

"Hallelujah" (Leonard Cohen) (4:02)	
"Betterman" (Eddie Vedder) (2:50)		
"Real Emotional Girl" (Randy Newman) (3:10)	
"Captain Valentine's Tango" (Paul Green/Kurt Weill) (1:49)	
"Je Rêve de Toi" (4:23)	
"I'm Your Man" (Leonard Cohen) (3:13)	
"Joan of Arc" (Leonard Cohen) (5:55)		
"Nanna's Song" (Kurt Weill) (4:40)
"Lucky to Be Me" (Leonard Bernstein/Betty Comden/Adolph Green) (4:04)
"Like a Rolling Stone" (Bob Dylan) (4:35)	
"Attendez Que Ma Joie Revienne" (2:56)
"Stay Well" (Maxwell Anderson/Kurt Weill) (3:37)
"Take This Waltz" (Leonard Cohen) (3:58)
"Mon Manège à Moi" (Jean Constantin/Norbert Glanzberg) (2:28)
"A Singer Must Die" (Leonard Cohen) (3:28)
"Creepin'" (Stevie Wonder) (4:54)

Personnel

Musicians 

Patricia O'Callaghan – vocals
Scott Alexander – bass
Gini Ball – violin
Dinah Beamish – cello
Phil Dwyer – soprano sax
Simon Edwards – bass
Mark Fewer – violin
David Heatherington – cello
Howard Hughes – acoustic guitar, piano
Kathleen Kajioka – viola
Andy Morris – percussion, vibraphone
Claire Orsler – viola
Rob Piltch – guitar
Chris Sharpe – bassoon
Barry Shiffman	 – violin
Anne Stephenson – violin
Mike Sweeney – bassoon
Tom Szczesniak – accordion
Claudio Vena – viola

Recording personnel 

Richard Fortin – producer
Howard Hughes – producer
Dirk Lange – associate producer
John "Beetle" Bailey	– engineer
Dave Pine – engineer
George Seara – engineer

References

External links 

Patricia O'Callaghan official website

2001 albums
Patricia O'Callaghan albums